The protected forest area, Uholka-Shyrokyi Luh, is located in the Trancarpathian region of Ukraine and belongs to the Carpathian Biosphere Reserve. It is the largest primeval beech forest worldwide with an area of 8800 ha. Since 1920, some parts of this forest have been protected. In 1992, Uholka-Shyrokyi Luh primeval beech forest was designated as UNESCO World Heritage Site. Later, several other primeval and old-growth beech forests in Europe were included (in 2007 and 2011) in the UNESCO World Heritage Site Ancient and Primeval Beech Forests of the Carpathians and Other Regions of Europe as well.
As a primeval beech forest, Uholka-Shyrokyi Luh is an important research hotspot. In 2001, a 10 ha (200 x 500 m) research sample plot was installed in Mala Uholka as part of a Swiss-Ukrainian research project, and in 2010 a full statistical inventory of the primeval forest was carried out. The next inventory is planned in 2019 to detect any changes.

Results of the 2010 forest inventory 
The forest inventory took place on a forest area of 10 300 ha, 8800 ha of which are primeval forests. The rest is considered to be natural forest. During the fieldwork, 314 sample plots, each 500 m2 in area, were surveyed. Within each plot, all trees with a diameter at breast height (DBH) of 6 cm and more were measured. 97% of all the 6779 trees measured were European beech (Fagus sylvatica L.). The oldest beech trees were nearly 500 years. The largest tree was a wych elm (Ulmus glabra Huds.) with a DBH of 150 cm, whereas the largest beech tree had a DBH of 140 cm. 10 beech trees per hectare had a DBH of at least 80 cm. The number of living trees consisted of 435 trees per hectare with a basal area of 36.6 m2/ha and volume of 582 m3/ha. In addition, the volume of standing and lying deadwood was 163 m3/ha. The vertical structure of this forest consisted of mainly three layers. Most gaps in the canopy cover were not larger than the crown of a canopy tree.

Ecotourism 
Two ecological hiking trails have been created for visitors to the primeval beech forest of Uholka-Shyrokyi Luh:
 Through the primeval beech forest of Mala Uholka (The Mala Uholka hiking trail): This trail guides visitors to Druzhba (Engl. “Friendship”), the longest karst cave in the Ukrainian Carpathians, and to Karstovyi Mist (Engl. “Karst or Stone Bridge”), a limestone formation in the form of an arch.
 Through the primeval beech forest of Velyka Uholka (The Velyka Uholka hiking trail): This trail guides visitors to Molochnyi Kamin (Engl. “Milky Stone”), a karst cave where Paleolithic people belonging to the bear-hunting culture used to live.

References

External links 
 Virgin Forests of Uholka. Nature Guide to the Largest Virgin Beech Forest of Europe. A UNESCO World Heritage Site.
 Urwälder im Zentrum Europas. Ein Naturführer durch das Karpaten-Biosphärenreservat in der Ukraine.
 Inventory of the Largest Primeval Beech Forest in Europe.
 Carpathian Biosphere Reserve.
 Swiss Federal Institute for Forest, Snow and Landscape Research WSL.

World Heritage Sites in Ukraine
Biosphere reserves of Ukraine
Primeval Beech Forests in Europe
Natural heritage sites in Ukraine